Meisam Bagheri (Persian میثم باقری) is an Iranian taekwondo athlete born on 18 April 1991 in Karaj.

He won a bronze medal at the 2009 World Taekwondo Championships in Copenhagen, Denmark, in the men's finweight. At the 2011 World Taekwondo Championships in Gyeongju, South Korea, he again won a bronze medal in the men's finweight.

Some of his honors: Bronze Asian Championship 2007 Bahrain International Gold 2008 2009 Baku World Cup silver 2009 Asian Club Cup Silver Bronze World Championship 2009 Denmark Fajr Cup Gold 2009 2010 China World Cup Gold Bronze Open Belgium 2010 German Open Gold 2011 Asian Clubs Cup Silver 2011 South Korea 2011 World Championship Bronze World Student Gold 2012 2012 British Open Gold 2013 Spanish Open Gold

Honar

References

External links 
 Meisam Bagheri  on Taekwondo data
 Meisam bagheri on instagram

 

Living people
Iranian male taekwondo practitioners
World Taekwondo Championships medalists
1991 births
People from Karaj
21st-century Iranian people